K-Beauty is an umbrella term for  skincare products that are derived from South Korea. The fad gained popularity worldwide, especially in East Asia, Southeast Asia, South Asia, and the Western world, and focuses on health, hydration, and an emphasis on brightening effects.

Although the focus for these beauty products are on skin aesthetics such as health, hydration, and luminous textured skin, glowing "glass skin" is favored by South Koreans. Rather than having layers of foundation, it is preferred to have a lengthy skincare regimen with a focus on toning and clarifying. Various natural ingredients are utilized in the creation of these products in addition to the numerous steps involved in a skincare routine. The skincare and cosmetics industry continues to lead the way in terms of economic gain, as displayed by the growth and expansion of Korean skincare domestically and internationally. The history of Korean skincare has influenced the standards for the ideal beauty and skincare routine which have become engrained into Korean norms over time. The result of which has led to several controversies and movements against harmful and rigid beauty standards set upon the Korean people.

The Asia-Pacific holds the largest market share in the K-beauty industry as of December 2020, with Asian countries/regions such as China, Hong Kong, India and South Korea being some of the largest consumers of K-beauty products. There is also a growing market for K-beauty products in Western countries such as the United Kingdom.

Ingredients and routine 
Korean beauty standards in the 21st century prize a youthful look and the appearance of moisture on the skin, which results in a preference for cremes over powders. K-beauty products are also more often designed for export, as a result of South Korea's history of import substitution industrialization. K-Beauty products are presented using sophisticated ingredients and appealing packaging. Products use ingredients ranging from more natural sources such as green tea leaves, orchid, soybean to snail slime, morphing masks, bee venom (an anti-inflammatory “faux-tox” alleged to relax facial muscles), moisturizing starfish extract, and pig collagen. The regimen involves a series of steps including cleansing rituals (with oil and water based products), sheet masks, essences, serums, moisturizers, cushion compacts, fermented products, and SPF 35 sunscreen. At night, the sunscreen is replaced by a “night cream”. Each regimen is addressed differently depending on complexion factors including hormonal fluctuations and lifestyle choices.

The ultra-elaborated K-Beauty skincare regimen consisted of an average of 10 steps. It normally starts with a dual cleaning ritual, series of sheet masks, essences lotions, serums, and rich moisturizers, and then ends with an SPF sunscreen, except at night when the sunscreen is swapped for a thick sleep cream. The facial skincare products are successful, due to the abundant development of new skin products and that two-thirds (68%) of all launches of skincare products were products from South Korea. Although men are increasingly participating in the market, the focus is still on women. Youtubers offer tutorials on how to apply cosmetics and skincare products.

Economics 
South Korea is the leader of the global beauty industry, it continues to advance; analysts expect K-Beauty to generate immense growth and expansion of Korean skincare brands to bring in high revenue. This continues to be the projection for the upcoming years.

South Korea is also known for being the center for many skin care brand’s research and development as well as a manufacturing and production hub. The majority of Koreans are found to be well-educated and informed about skin care and health, so many of the products developed by Korea are thoroughly regulated. An additional factor for its success includes the influence of popular culture, such as the Hallyu Wave, where celebrities promote makeup brands and help to promote them domestically and internationally.

K-Beauty is associated with the Korean Wave; for example, the South Korean cosmetics company Amorepacific sponsored My Love from the Star, a 2014 K-drama whose constant marketing of Amorepacific products resulted in an increase in skincare and lipstick products of 75 and 400 percent. The combination of increased international tourism in South Korea combined with K-Beauty products' presence in duty-free shops has also worked to increase sales of cosmetics in Korea.

History 

In the past, Koreans were known to create and utilize several skincare and makeup products. Additionally, the superficial appearance was thought to be linked to one's inner health and care. Many were made from natural ingredients around them such as oils, plants, or natural powders. These natural cosmetics at the time added fragrance to the product which was often thought to reduce stress and fatigue, as stated in the Gyuhap Chongseo or Women’s Encyclopedia. The origins of Korean beauty developed during the time of the Three Kingdoms where beauty culture became more prevalent. A special emphasis was placed upon the Goryeo era as it was known to be the pinnacle for Korean beauty standards. In the Joseon Dynasty, the idea of beauty stems from fair-looking skin and cherry lips to accentuates the elegancy of their status.

Beauty standards and controversies 
Throughout each of the Three Kingdom eras, women and elites were often informed of what beauty products were acceptable via the Gyuhap Chongseo. The Three Kingdoms included from oldest to recent: Silla, Goguryeo, and Baekje (BC 37~668). Much of the information and knowledge of skincare and beauty from the Silla era was carried onto the Goguryeo era where further advancements were implemented. The Gyuhap Chongseo detailed the proper ways to do one’s makeup.

The Goguryeo era was thought to be excessive by Joseon standards. During the Joseon dynasty, Confucianism dictated what was acceptable in terms of beauty with a focus on the inner self. Korean beauty often flowed from the lower-class to the elites as many elites mirrored the female entertainers, known as gisaeng. Beauty accessories and containers were then invented and sold. Trade and imports from other countries, like Russia and China, then became more frequent.

This is evidence of South Koreans’ strong interest in physical attractiveness. South Korea has the world’s highest rate of cosmetic surgery per capita. It has become the destination for nip and tuck tourism. The tough standards in South Korea have created the “Escape the Corset” movement to cast off the country’s rigid beauty standards.  This movement was created by a group of women that wanted to put a stop and challenging tone of the most beauty-obsessed capitals in the world, their long-accepted attitude towards plastic surgery and cosmetic. This movement was inspired by the #MeToo Movement. The Korean wave has led to unrealistic beauty standards among young people in South Korea. More advertisements on cosmetics and facial beauty products are found in South Korean fashion magazines than those in the United States.

The value that South Koreans have placed on physical attractiveness can influence a young person’s self-esteem and interpersonal and romantic relationships, for those who are not so up to the standards. Social aesthetic preferences for women wearing makeup and having a small 'heart-shaped' face is strong. In South Korea, pressure for conformity against people that leave the mainstream path is relatively intense as compared to other advanced, democratized countries.
Plastic surgery is huge in South Korea. It is also considered one of plastic surgery capitals of the world. Since so many young people in South korea feel the pressure to look a certain way,many turn to surgery. In 2014 it was recorded that 980,000 procedures were done in that year. Along with the popularity of kbeauty many foreigners are beginning to fly to South Korea for surgery.

Clean Beauty 
The global natural skincare product market in 2021 was estimated at USD 6.7 billion, and is expected to reach USD 7.3 billion in 2022. 

Natural skincare is often associated with clean beauty, which refers to cosmetic products that favor natural ingredients yet often incorporate synthetics that have been deemed safe for people and the planet. Although they go hand in hand, to be specific, natural can be clean, but clean is not always natural. 

Clean beauty at large encompasses conscious, cruelty-free, vegan, and sustainable packaging, and it is significantly connected to wellness. 

Whamisa is one of the most renown clean beauty brands among K beauty brands. They formulate only plant-derived, organic, and vegan ingredients with natural preservatives with organic certifications, such as BDIH and COSMOS. Aromatica is another leading clean beauty skincare brand with EWG-verified certification, and they specialize in holistic aromatherapy-infused skincare. 

Schwanen Garten is a clean beauty brand specializing in powerful antioxidant effects with all-natural yet potent ingredient formulation avoiding the use of animal-derived ingredients, parabens, sulfates, phthalates, silicone, mineral oil, PEG, alcohol, colorants, GMOs, and fragrances.

See also 
 Light skin in Japanese culture
Cosmetics in Korea
Amorepacific
LG Beauty
T-Beauty

References 

Cosmetic industry
Skin care
South Korean culture